Reginald George Turnill (12 May 1915 – 12 February 2013) was the BBC's aviation (and space) correspondent for twenty years during the beginnings of crewed space exploration and the early jet age in aviation, including the breakthrough in supersonic passenger flight represented by Concorde. He covered NASA's space missions and all the Apollo program moon missions for the BBC. Turnill's connection with the BBC, as a freelance, continued for some years after his official retirement.

Career

Reginald Turnill began his career at the age of 15 as a reporter's telephonist at the Press Association, the British news agency, becoming a reporter by 1935. After war service as a machine gunner in the Middlesex Regiment, and as a warrant officer reporting courts martial for the Judge Advocate General's department in Naples, he returned to the Press Association in 1946, where he remained until his recruitment by the BBC in 1956 as assistant industrial correspondent.

In 1958 he became the Corporation's Air and Space Correspondent, with a brief to include defence as well. He was not a War correspondent; he concentrated on technology. He became friendly with Wernher von Braun, who was only three years older, although his approach was initially frosty and reticent. He covered all the crewed spaceflights as well as the introduction of passenger jets from the Comet IV to Concorde.

On 2 March 1969 he was the BBC's reporter on Concorde's maiden flight at Toulouse-Blagnac Airport.

In April 1970, he was the first journalist to report on the Apollo 13 catastrophe via the BBC World Service when based at the Lyndon B. Johnson Space Center on 13 April 1970.

After retiring from the BBC staff on his 60th birthday he continued working as a freelance broadcaster, writing many books and continuing as Newsround'''s Space Editor until the mid-1980s. In 1990 he presented Return Ticket, a five-part Radio 4 series about the Apollo 13 mission.

He was largely superseded at the BBC by Christopher Wain.

Writer
He contributed to series of books notably the Observer's Book of Manned Spaceflight and the Observer's Book of Unmanned Spaceflight in the 1970s, published by Frederick Warne & Co. In the 1980s he edited the Jane's Spaceflight Directory. He was particularly disappointed by the cancellation of the Black Arrow British space programme in July 1971, at the very moment it was providing results. In 2003 he published his book 'The Moonlandings, An eyewitness account' in which he recounted how and why the first men landed on the moon.

Turnill wrote many obituaries of people involved in aerospace and other figures for The Guardian, The Times and The Daily Telegraph, the last to appear during his lifetime being of Sir James Hamilton, who helped design Concorde's wing. It appeared in The Guardian in May 2012.

Following a few months of poor health Turnill died aged 97 at the Pilgrim's Hospice in Ashford, Kent, on 12 February 2013. In 2006 he won the Sir Arthur Clarke Award Lifetime Achievement Award.

Personal life

He married Margaret Hennings in 1938 in Westminster. They have two sons (born 1940 and 1944). He lived in Sandgate, Kent.

In his early life, the 18th century poet John Clare had a great affection for the brothers John and Richard Turnill, whose father Robert was a local farmer; Robert was Reg's great-great-grandfather. In his Autobiographical Fragments, Clare says:

Clare goes on to say:

So the young John Turnill liked books, the stars and was of a generous nature. Clare dedicated a sonnet to him:

Turnill, we toiled together all the day,
And lived like hermits from the boys at play;
We read and walked together round the fields,
Not for the beauty that the journey yields –
But muddied fish, and bragged o'er what we caught,
And talked about the few old books we bought.
Though low in price you knew their value well,
And I thought nothing could their worth excel;
And then we talked of what we wished to buy,
And knowledge always kept our pockets dry.
We went the nearest ways, and hummed a song,
And snatched the pea pods as we went along,
And often stooped for hunger on the way
To eat the sour grass in the meadow hay.

Publications
 The Moonlandings: An Eyewitness Account (foreword by Buzz Aldrin), 2002, Cambridge University Press, 
 Celebrating Concorde, 1994, Ian Allan Publishing, 
 Farnborough: the Story of the RAE (with Arthur Reed), 1981, Hale Publishing, 
 The Language of Space: A Dictionary of Astronautics, 1970, Littlehampton Book Services, 
 Moonslaught: The full story of Man's race to the Moon, 1969, Purnell and Sons
 Jane's Spaceflight Directory (edited by Reginald Turnill), various editions during the 1980s,
 Astronautics, 1970, Littlehampton Book Services, 
 Observer's Book of Manned Spaceflight, 1972, Frederick Warne & Co. Ltd, ASIN B0055OFWQ8
 Observer's Book of Unmanned Spaceflight'', 1974, Frederick Warne & Co. Ltd,

See also
 Jay Barbree

References

External links
 BBC Archive
 The Eagle has Landed
 Interview on Astrotalkuk.org in April 2008

Video clips
 Discussing Apollo 13 in April 2010
 An interview about Yuri Gagarin's first international news conference in Moscow on 14 April 1961. Reg was present for the BBC. Astrotalkuk.org April 2011

Audio clips
 Concorde's maiden flight in March 1969 on BBC School Radio

1915 births
2013 deaths
Aviation in the United Kingdom
Aviation journalists
Aviation writers
BBC newsreaders and journalists
BBC World Service people
History of spaceflight
People from Dover, Kent
Space advocates
People from Sandgate, Kent
Military personnel from Kent
Middlesex Regiment soldiers
British Army personnel of World War II